August Kopff (February 5, 1882 – April 25, 1960) was a German astronomer and discoverer of several comets and asteroids.

Kopff studied and worked in Heidelberg, getting his PhD there in 1906 and he then joined the Humboldt University of Berlin where he became the Director of the Institute for Astronomical Calculation.

He discovered some comets, including periodic comet 22P/Kopff and the non-periodic C/1906 E1. He discovered a number of asteroids, including notably the Trojan asteroids 617 Patroclus and 624 Hektor.

The lunar crater Kopff is named after him, as is the asteroid 1631 Kopff. Minor planet 805 Hormuthia is named after his wife, Hormuth.

List of discovered minor planets

References 
 

1882 births
1960 deaths
20th-century German astronomers
Discoverers of asteroids
Discoverers of comets
Members of the Prussian Academy of Sciences
Scientists from Heidelberg
People from the Grand Duchy of Baden
 
Members of the German Academy of Sciences at Berlin